Charlie "Choo Choo" Brown (born April 5, 1958 in Philadelphia, Pennsylvania) is an American former professional boxer who was the IBF Lightweight champion of the world.

Pro career 
Known as "Choo-Choo" Brown, Brown turned pro in 1979 and captured the vacant newly created IBF lightweight title with a decision win over Melvin Paul in 1984. He lost the belt in his first defense to Harry Arroyo the same year, in a bout refreed by International Boxing Hall of Fame member Larry Hazzard. Brown never fought for another major title and retired after 11 consecutive losses in 1993, including losses to Loreto Garza, Cornelius Boza-Edwards, and José Luis Ramírez.

Professional boxing record

See also 
 List of lightweight boxing champions

References

External links 
 

1958 births
Living people
African-American boxers
Boxers from Philadelphia
Lightweight boxers
World boxing champions
American male boxers
21st-century African-American people
20th-century African-American sportspeople